Ahmed Jamal (born 3 September 1988) is a Pakistani first-class cricketer who plays for Sui Southern Gas Company. He is a six feet four inches (193 cm) tall right-arm pace bowler. In October 2017, he took nine wickets for 50 runs for Sui Southern Gas Corporation against Sui Northern Gas Pipelines Limited in the 2017–18 Quaid-e-Azam Trophy, his career-best figures.

Jamal is noted for taking out Pakistan’s “King of Speed” competition in 2013, registering a bowling speed of 143 km/h.

References

External links
 

1988 births
Living people
Pakistani cricketers
National Bank of Pakistan cricketers
Pakistan Customs cricketers
Sui Southern Gas Company cricketers
Cricketers from Abbottabad